Arnold is an unincorporated community in Grove Township, Humboldt County, Iowa, United States.

History
Arnold's population was 26 in 1902.

References

Unincorporated communities in Humboldt County, Iowa
Unincorporated communities in Iowa